The fourth season of the animated comedy series Bob's Burgers began airing on Fox in the United States on September 29, 2013, and concluded on May 18, 2014. The show was once again part of Fox's Sunday night lineup, initially airing in its usual timeslot of 8:30 PM Eastern. Beginning on March 9 and continuing for the rest of the season, Bob's Burgers moved to 7:00 PM Eastern; the move came as a result of the addition of Cosmos: A Spacetime Odyssey to the network's lineup.

In this season, Bob subs as the home economics teacher at the kids' school (Bob and Deliver), Linda goes to her high school reunion and ends up singing there (Purple Rain-Union), the family tries to create a local Super Bowl advertisement (Easy Com-mercial, Easy Go-mercial), and the kids set up a trap for Santa Claus (Christmas in the Car).

Production
Guest stars returning include Will Forte, John Michael Higgins, Rob Huebel, Ken Jeong, Kevin Kline, Megan Mullally, Laura and Sarah Silverman, and Paul F. Tompkins, as well as new guest stars that include Bobcat Goldthwait, Jordan Peele, and Molly Shannon.

Episodes

References

External links
 
 
 

2013 American television seasons
2014 American television seasons
Bob's Burgers seasons